Katarzyna Gębala (born 4 September 1974) is a Polish cross-country skier. She competed in three events at the 1998 Winter Olympics.

Cross-country skiing results
All results are sourced from the International Ski Federation (FIS).

Olympic Games

World Championships

World Cup

Season standings

References

External links
 

1974 births
Living people
Polish female cross-country skiers
Olympic cross-country skiers of Poland
Cross-country skiers at the 1998 Winter Olympics
Sportspeople from Bielsko-Biała